Cleo Nordi (  Kronstadt, Russian Empire – 30 March 1983 London), was a Russo-Finnish ballerina who danced as a soloist with Anna Pavlova's company before becoming a renowned teacher of the Russian ballet tradition in London. She was involved in three dance-related films.

Biography 
Nordi trained in St.Petersburg with Nicolai Legat, with Lyubov Yegorova, Olga Preobrajenska and Vera Trefilova and in Helsingfors with George Gé. On 13 December 1924 she made her Paris debut at the Théâtre Fémina in a light entertainment. The following year she became a member of the Paris Opera where she stayed until 1926. Later that year she joined Anna Pavlova's company with which she toured and danced solo roles until the latter's death in 1931.

Through her marriage to Walford Hyden, Pavlova's musical director and a light orchestra conductor, she was one of the first ballerinas screened on British television in 1934. She made dance arrangements for the musical theatre, sometimes herself appearing in productions and became involved in cinema. She had supporting roles in two films, in Cafe Colette (1937), Latin Quarter (1945) and was choreographer in the production of Caravan (1946). She travelled widely, including to Australia and Asia where she adopted the practice of Kundalini yoga.

After the Second world war she settled in London where she held classes in West London and latterly in studios in Scarsdale Villas, and in Eldon Road, Kensington. She became an established and esteemed ballet teacher. Among her hundreds of pupils, notable have been Rukmini Devi Arundale, Tamara Tchinarova, Roger Tully, Nadia Nerina Pina Bausch.
and Elaine McDonald, dancer and then Principal Dancer with Scottish Ballet 1969 - 1989.

Cleo Nordi died in Fulham, aged 85 in 1983.

Bibliography 
 Davis, Janet Rowson. "Ballet on British Television, 1932-1935: A Supplement." Dance Chronicle, vol. 7, no. 3, 1984, pp. 294–325. JSTOR, www.jstor.org/stable/1567654. Nordi appeared dancing the Tarantella in an early UK television broadcast of ballet in 1934. Retrieved 02.02.2019

See also
 List of Russian ballet dancers

References

External links
 Article from Andros on Ballet
 Alastair Macaulay. "Anna Pavlova, global missionary for ballet classicism: Women’s History Month in Dance, 2021" 
BFI entry Cleo Nordi
 Photographs by GBL Wilson of Cleo Nordi with some of her pupils from the Royal Academy of Dance Archive Topfoto - Preview ARP1300390 - CLEO NORDI ; 1899 - 1983 Finnish dancer and teacher ; Her last dance class in London ; September 1964 ; Credit : G.B.L. Wilson / Royal Adacemy of Dance / ArenaPAL
 Cleo Nordi recollects Anna Pavlova in Katharine Kanter: Pavlova Recollections by her Associates in Dansomanie Dansomanie :: Voir le sujet - Timely recollections of Anna Pavlova, by her associates Retrieved 30-01-2019 
 Wolfgang Hainisch 1950 portrait of Cleo Nordi held by National Arts Educational Archive, Yorkshire Sculpture Park: Leonard Bartle’s Selection retrieved 02.02.2019

1898 births
1983 deaths
People from Kronstadt
People from Petergofsky Uyezd
Finnish ballerinas
Russian ballerinas
Ballet masters
Russian ballet dancers
Ballet teachers
Emigrants from the Russian Empire to the United Kingdom